Chocen may refer to:
 Choceň, a town in the Pardubice Region, Czech Republic
 Choceń, a village in Włocławek County, Kuyavian-Pomeranian Voivodeship, Poland
 Gmina Choceń, an administrative district

See also 
 Chocenice, a village and municipality in the Czech Republic
 Chotzen syndrome, an autosomal dominant congenital disorder